The Akaflieg Berlin B13 is a two-seat motor-glider designed and built in Germany.

Development 
Students at Akaflieg Berlin studied a high-performance motor-glider with the engine in the nose and an automatically folding propeller. After approval was given, a prototype was built in 1991, as the ' Akaflieg Berlin B13', using GFRP (glass-fibre re-inforced plastic) to form a fuselage with smooth lines, housing the engine in the nose and a two-seat side-by-side cockpit covered by a large plexiglas canopy.

Intended to use a sustainer motor, for sustaining flight only, power was to be supplied by a modified 24.5KW (33 hp) engine in the extreme nose driving a 5-blade folding retractable propeller, specially developed by Prof. Oehler. However, problems with the integration of the engine with the fuselage have prevented the fitting of the engine, resulting in the 'B13' being restricted to un-powered flight only.

Specifications (B13 power off)

See also

References

External links

   Akaflieg Berlin B13
  Akaflieg Berlin
  Sailplane Directory
  Akaflieg Berlin

1990s German sailplanes
Akaflieg Berlin aircraft
T-tail aircraft
Aircraft first flown in 1991